Perconia is a genus of moths in the family Geometridae described by Jacob Hübner in 1823.

Species
Perconia strigillaria (Hübner, 1787) – grass wave
Perconia baeticaria (Staudinger, 1871)

References

Aspitatini